The Newcastle Building Society is a UK building society that has its head office in Newcastle upon Tyne, England. It is a member of the Building Societies Association.

History
It was formed in 1980 as a result of a merger between the Grainger (founded 1861) and Newcastle Permanent Building Societies (founded 1863). Its first Chief Executive was Phillip Langley-Essen after holding the position of Chief Executive and Managing Director for 16 years at the Grainger. He was influential in the formation of the new society and even designed the new logo. Mr. Langley -Essen retired from the Newcastle in 1986.

In 2006, it merged with another Newcastle-based society, the Universal Building Society.

The society opened another office at Cobalt Business Park in North Tyneside in 2008.

In May 2010, the society announced its repositioning program in which it announced that it would make 126 jobs redundant and create 80 jobs in its Solutions division.

In February 2011, it announced that it plans to lend more to the North East's housing market.

In December 2011, Wirecard AG of Germany acquired Newcastle Building Society's prepaid card issuing activities in six European countries.

In February 2023 it was confirmed that the society had agreed to merge with the Manchester Building Society. The merger was expected to be completed by July 1st 2023.

References

External links
Newcastle Building Society
Building Societies Association
Entry in KPMG Building Societies Database 2008
2010 year-end results, announced March 2011 

Building societies of England
Banks established in 1980
Companies based in Newcastle upon Tyne
1980 establishments in England